Joey Osbourne is a founding member and drummer for Acid King, Altamont, and The Stimmies. He has also been a drummer for The Men of Porn, Triple X (an X cover band), and for San Francisco punk band The Corruptors. Currently, he is the drummer and backing vocalist for roots rock/dark folk band Saturn Returns, which features ex-members of Lost Goat and Nite After Nite as well as members of Old Grandad and Walken.

Discography

with Acid King

with Altamont

with Porn (The Men Of)

with The Stimmies

References 

Year of birth missing (living people)
Living people
American drummers